John Wick is a 2014 American action thriller film directed by Chad Stahelski and written by Derek Kolstad. Its story follows John Wick (Keanu Reeves), a legendary hitman who is forced out of retirement to seek revenge against the men who killed his puppy, a final gift from his recently deceased wife. John Wick also stars Michael Nyqvist, Alfie Allen, Adrianne Palicki, Bridget Moynahan, Dean Winters, Ian McShane, John Leguizamo, and Willem Dafoe.

Kolstad's script drew on his interest in action, revenge, and neo-noir films. Titled Scorn, the rights were purchased by producer Basil Iwanyk as his first independent film production. Reeves, who was experiencing a career lull, liked the script and recommended experienced stunt and action choreographers, Stahelski and David Leitch direct the action scenes. Instead, the pair successfully lobbied to co-direct John Wick. Despite the project nearly being cancelled weeks prior to filming, principal photography began on October 7, 2013, on a $20–$30million budget. Stahelski and Leitch focused on highly-choreographed, long single takes to convey their action, eschewing the rapid cuts and closeup shots of contemporary action films. Iwanyk struggled to secure theatrical distributors, as industry executives were dismissive of an action film by first-time directors and Reeves's recent filmography had underperformed. The distribution rights were eventually purchased by Lionsgate Films and a release date scheduled only two months later for October 24, 2014. 

The marketing campaign was seen as a success, changing the perception of John Wick as disposable entertainment to a prestige event helmed by an affable leading actor. The film exceeded box office projections, earning $86million worldwide, becoming a modest success, and earned generally positive reviews for its style and action sequences. It was hailed as a comeback for Reeves, the John Wick character playing to his strengths as an actor. The film's mythology of a criminal underworld with specific rituals and rules was also praised as the film's most unique and interesting feature.

John Wick is now considered one of the greatest action films ever made. Its unexpected success led to the John Wick franchise, one of the most successful action franchises, which comprises three sequels, John Wick: Chapter 2 (2017), John Wick: Chapter 3 – Parabellum (2019), and John Wick: Chapter 4 (2023), as well as video games and comic books. The franchise includes the upcoming spin-off film Ballerina and television series The Continental. John Wick has been influential on action films. It is seen as having revitalized the genre, popularizing long single takes with choreographed and detailed action.

Plot

John Wick is grieving the death of his wife, Helen, from an illness. To help him cope, she arranged for him to receive a beagle puppy as a gift. A few days later, Wick is accosted at a gas station outside of New York City by a group of Russian gangsters, led by Iosef, who fail to intimidate Wick into selling them his 1969 Boss 429 Mustang. That night, the men break into Wick's home, beat him up, and kill the puppy before stealing the car. Iosef takes the Mustang to a chop shop to remove its identifying details, but the shop owner, Aurelio, recognizes the car and refuses service. Wick learns from Aurelio that Iosef is the son of Viggo Tarasov, the boss of the city's Russian mafia. 

Learning of his son's actions, Viggo beats Iosef and chastises him for incurring Wick's wrath. Viggo reveals that Wick was formerly a hitman in his employ, renowned and feared in the criminal underworld as the "Baba Yaga", a ruthless and relentless "man of focus, commitment, and sheer will." After Wick fell in love with Helen, a civilian, Viggo gave him a seemingly "impossible task" to earn his freedom.

Wick recovers his concealed stash from his former career, including weapons and gold coins used as underworld currency for special services. He refuses Viggo's attempt to make amends for his son's actions and kills the hitman squad subsequently sent to his home. As a result, Viggo puts a $2million bounty on Wick's head, and his former mentor Marcus is enlisted to take him out. Wick lodges in the city at the Continental, a luxurious hotel that serves as neutral ground for the underworld and conducting criminal business there is strictly forbidden. The hotel's owner and Wick's old friend, Winston, warns him about the dangers of returning to the life he left behind. Despite this, Winston secretly informs Wick that Iosef is at the Red Circle nightclub. Wick infiltrates the club and confronts Iosef, but he is attacked by Kirill, Viggo's henchman, and forced to retreat to the Continental for medical attention.

As Wick rests he is targeted by a hitwoman named Ms. Perkins, who sneaks into his room. Marcus sees Perkins from an adjacent building and fires a warning shot to alert Wick. He wakes up and subdues Perkins, who reveals that Viggo doubled the bounty for her to kill him in the hotel. She also discloses that Viggo has a high-value stash concealed in a church. Wick has another hitman, Harry, secure Perkins, but she escapes and kills him. 

At the church, Wick destroys Viggo's cache of cash and extensive blackmail material. When Viggo arrives to assess the damage, Wick assaults him and his men, but is  captured after being hit by Kirill's car. Wick tells Viggo that he will not stop until Iosef is dead because the puppy gave him hope and a chance to not be alone in his grief for Helen. Marcus intervenes again to save Wick, allowing him to kill Kirill and threaten Viggo into revealing his son's location. Wick assaults the safehouse and kills Iosef. Afterward, Marcus encourages Wick to return to the normal life he has built, but their meeting is witnessed by Perkins, who reveals Marcus's duplicity to Viggo. He has Marcus tortured and killed before calling Wick to taunt him with the details, drawing him back to the city.

Perkins is executed at Winston's behest for breaking the Continental's rules, and Winston informs Wick that Viggo is preparing to leave the city by helicopter. Wick races to the New York Harbor, where he fights and mortally wounds Viggo. Resigned to dying from his own injuries, Wick watches a video on his phone of Helen telling him they need to go home. He breaks into a nearby animal clinic, treats his wounds, and adopts a pit bull puppy scheduled to be euthanized before beginning the walk home.

Cast

 Keanu Reeves as John Wick: A retired hitman who is legendary in the criminal underworld
 Michael Nyqvist as Viggo Tarasov: A vicious Russian crime boss and Wick's former employer
 Alfie Allen as Iosef Tarasov: Viggo's reckless and arrogant son
 Adrianne Palicki as Ms. Perkins: A ruthless and highly skilled hitwoman
 Bridget Moynahan as Helen: Wick's beloved and devoted wife
 Dean Winters as Avi: Viggo's attorney 
 Lance Reddick as Charon / Hotel Manager: The Continental's concierge 
 Toby Leonard Moore as Victor: A Russian gangster working with Iosef
 Ian McShane as Winston: The enigmatic owner of the Continental
 John Leguizamo as Aurelio: A mechanic who owns a high-end chop shop
 Willem Dafoe as Marcus: A skilled sniper and Wick's old friend

The cast also includes Omer Barnea as Gregori, Iosef's underling who kills Wick's dog, Daniel Bernhardt as Kirill, a former Russian military commander turned Viggo's henchman, Thomas Sadoski as Jimmy, a police officer, and David Patrick Kelly as Charlie, a "cleaner" who destroys criminal evidence, including bodies. The Continental staff includes Bridget Regan as Addy, a bartender fond of Wick, and Randall Duk Kim as a hotel doctor. Clarke Peters portrays Harry, a hitman, Kevin Nash appears as Francis, a bouncer at the Red Circle night club; and Munro M. Bonnell plays a corrupt priest protecting Viggo's vault beneath a church. A beagle puppy called Andy portrays Wick's dog, Daisy.

Production

Writing
During the early 2000s, Derek Kolstad struggled to gain recognition as a screenwriter, despite being related to successful author Lori Wick. Kolstad produced up to eight screenplays per year, yet none of them were realized projects. In an effort to further his career, Kolstad moved closer to the film industry in Los Angeles but decided to leave after two months. With encouragement from his wife, Sonja, Kolstad secured a manager and wrote 60 screenplays before finding success with the low-budget action films, One in the Chamber (2012) and The Package (2013).

Over four days in either 2012 or 2013, Kolstad wrote a spec script titled Scorn. The inspiration for the script came from two "terrible revenge movies" that Kolstad had watched. The story centered around the character of John Wick, a long-retired hitman in his mid-60s to mid-70s, modeled after older actors such as Clint Eastwood and Paul Newman, who is forced back into his former life. The script included elements such as Wick's elderly dog, long-deceased wife, Charon, Winston, the Continental, and the underworld gold coins, with a more modest kill count of 11 compared to the film's several dozen. Wick is portrayed as an underworld legend but one who has been absent for decades, causing younger criminals to dismiss the tales. Kolstad aimed to explore the character of "the worst man in existence", Wick, finding and losing salvation through love and what would happen afterward. The writer struggled to determine the inciting incident that would lead to Wick's return, ultimately choosing his dog's murder over the cliche of killing the character's wife and family. Kolstad focused his efforts on the first act, believing that a solid opening would make later acts easier to write.

The draft was influenced by the variety of action films of which Kolstad was fond, including Aliens (1986), Predator (1987), and Die Hard (1988), revenge films, western films, and noir films such as Miller's Crossing (1990). Kolstad included black comedy, believing levity added to the characters' humanity, drawing influence from comic actors such as Buster Keaton, Harold Lloyd, Charlie Chaplin, and Roscoe Arbuckle, as well as his favorite animated television series, inluding Rick and Morty and SpongeBob SquarePants. After garnering feedback from family and agents, Kolstad made minor changes and the spec script was put out for sale.

Development

At the same time, producer Basil Iwanyk was developing films for Warner Bros. Pictures through his studio Thunder Road Films. Frustrated at not being involved beyond sourcing scripts, he wanted the autonomy of developing independent films so he could be more involved in the process throughout. In particular, he focused on action films which could be made for relatively low budgets. Iwanyk read Kolstad's spec script, appreciating its "subversive" tone and "emotional throughline", as well as the relatability and accessibility of a man seeking revenge after losing his wife, his dog, his car, and his home being violated. However, several studios were interested in the spec script and could offer Kolstad more money than Iwanyk.

Kolstad met with his agent to discuss the five offers received, but the agent told him to ignore all but the lowest bid by Iwanyk, because Thunder Road Films was ready to start work immediately. The deal was completed in February 2013. Kolstad began rewrites alongside Iwanyk and his fellow producer Erica Lee over two months. Iwanyk originally envisioned older actors such as Eastwood or Harrison Ford as John Wick, but later decided he wanted someone who was not physically older "but who has a seasoned history in the film world." 

In April 2013, Iwanyk's friend at talent company Creative Artists Agency was Keanu Reeves's agent, and asked Iwanyk if he had any action projects suitable for the actor. He gave the agent the script, telling him to ensure Reeves understood, "clearly, you're not seventy-five." Reeves was interested in the dynamics between the real and underworld and the emotional connnection to Wick's wife. At the same time, the script was sent out to several directors, but Kolstad said their responses were, "'I totally want to do this. Maybe John Wick is married, his mother-in-law lives with him, he has four kids, and they kill the entire family?' And I was like 'You don't get it. We're not doing that'". Others were not interested because the idea came across as a typical Reeves action film.

While Reeves was negotiating his involvement, he sent the script to Chad Stahelski and David Leitch, who had worked alongside him as stunt coordinators and performers on the initial The Matrix trilogy of films and other successive projects. They had since founded the action design and stunt company 87Eleven Productions. He recommended them to choreograph or direct the action sequences, believing their style matched the script's tone. Stahelski and Leitch were interested in the variety of action scenes, but they wanted to direct the film itself. The pair gained Reeves support after pitching him their vision of an assassin thriller with a realistic tone in an "otherworldly setting", in which Wick is an urban legend. Reeves said they impressed him with their intent to make each character memorable and thoughts on the themes of living a double life. In May, Reeves was confirmed for the lead role, with Stahelski and Leitch to direct.

Kolstad and Reeves spent the weekends over the next two months performing about six rewrites to fit the actor's style. Wick was made younger, with Reeves intending to portray the character as a 35-year-old, and dialogue was trimmed to convey Wick as a "badass"; a five page conversation between Wick and the priest character was trimmed to Wick simply responding "Uh-huh". They also decided not to depict Wick's "impossible task", believing they should never show Wick from before Helen's death.

Casting

Many of the principal cast were added to the film in September and October 2013. Casting focused on who could be available in the two-and-a-half weeks before filming began while remaining affordable. The task was helped by filming in New York City, allowing them to secure actors based in the city, such as Ian McShane, who only had to be present to film their scenes without travelling far. Character actors were preferred, who could vivify Kolstad's characters who might have little screentime but were considered essential to providing more information about Wick's past and the underworld.

Reeves's John Wick was named by Kolstad after his grandfather, and Helen was named for his grandmother. The actor was paid between $1–$2million for his performance. Reeves brought his personal experience of loss and grief to the role, believing he related to the character's emotional state. Describing the character, Reeves said, "[Wick] thought [his old life] was something he would never go back to... [Wick] thought he was stronger than he is, when really he'd been drawing that strength from his wife, Helen... he thought he was in control, but the switch flips and there's no turning back. I always thought of it as being a kind of Old Testament revenge story. When someone takes the things he cherishes, violence erupts and [Wick] can't temper it." Stahelski and Leitch emphasised loss and humanity as a fundamental aspect of Wick, wanting to avoid making him a "stereotypical badass assassin." They had Reeves grow out his hair and beard and dressed him in stylish suits to create recognizable visual elements to Wick. Reeves undertook four months of training, including several hours per day in a gym, strict diet, stretches, and learning choreography. Although he had previous martial arts experience, the directors wanted to create a style fitting for Wick, having Reeves train in judo, Japanese jujutsu, Brazilian jiu-jitsu, and arnis, as well as taking tactical gun courses with the Los Angeles SWAT and Navy SEALs. He also learned stunt driving skills, including drifting a car while aiming a gun.

On his role as Viggo, Michael Nyqvist said, "I found the relationship between [Wick] and Viggo to be interesting. Viggo has always liked [Wick] because he was brilliant at his job. They have the kind of love and respect you might see between a father and son." Nyqist trained in the Russian martial art sambo, reflecting the character's impoverished street brawler origins, and informed his performance, in part, based on his Russian trainers. He generally played his character as a straight man with some quirks. Kolstad described Iosef as "a dinner-theater version of his father. Iosef is a rich kid who imagines himself a tough guy; but without his father's muscle, he's a punk... he's one spoiled kid." Alfie Allen said he was attracted to speaking different languages and accents, spending time in Russian bathhouses in New York to test his dialect. He found some of the physical punishment his character endures difficult, alongside spontaneous additions of Russian dialogue he had to quickly learn.  

The female assassin, Ms. Perkins, was written as a male character until Adrianne Palicki's casting. Describing the character, Palicki said, "Ms. Perkins is what you think the quintessential assassin would be. She's cold, heartless, conniving, badass, and I think that she has fun with what she does. She enjoys it. I think that she'd clearly do it for a dollar." Palicki trained in judo and jujitsu for a few months and spent two weeks learning the choreography for her fight scene with Reeves. Moynahan did not read the script entirely, wanting to only know as much as Helen would know about Wick. Iwanyk said, "Helen probably thought John had some skeletons in his closet, but it wasn't important. All we know as an audience is that the moment he met her, he became a different person."

Kolstad described Winston as someone who "doesn't say a lot, but when he does, the Earth moves. If [Wick] and Viggo are the gods of New York, Winston is the titan." McShane took the role because of his fondness for neo-noir films. John Leguizamo informed his performance based on Aurelio's "slick" clothing, saying, "I'm walking through the set and all of a sudden I start feeling a little cocky, like I'm somebody. It all helps." Willem Dafoe described Marcus as "an assassin on a very high level", who serves as a father figure to Wick in "the sense that he's the king of the pride. When a new lion takes over a pride, he slaughters all the cubs." He added traits to his aging character such as a scene of Marcus making juice because he believed the character would maintain his health to keep up with the younger assassins.

Pre-production
Financial issues beset the production leading into filming, as Iwanyk had limited assets compared to the major studios and he considered his backers unreliable. He recounted an investor failing to pay on time and, when he did, "he did things like children do, if he owed us $2.4million he'd send us a check for $2,400 and go 'whoops! I messed up.'" Iwanyk admitted he and his executives lacked experience in film financing and, five days before the scheduled filming date, he considered cancelling the project. His lawyer advised that he would be likely sued into bankruptcy by those involved and their associated guild unions. Iwanyk twice deferred his own fees to cover costs and lent the costume designer his personal credit card for resources, rationalizing he would at least earn air miles. The lack of financial security delayed filming by two weeks. Iwanyk described them as the hardest and most stressful weeks of his career; his family visited to ensure he was safe as he was not sleeping or eating.

When financing was secured, it was not as much as been originally promised. Some principal cast made salary concessions, with Reeves putting his own money into the project, and Stahelski and Leitch modified scenes to keep the budget low. The majority of funding was provided by Michael Witherill of MJW Films, DefyNite Films, and actress Eva Longoria.

New York City was chosen as the main filming location. Although filming there would cost millions of dollars more than alternatives such as Baton Rouge, Chicago, or Detroit, Iwanyk said that in a neo-noir film, the location is also a character, and "if I shoot [John Wick] with the Brooklyn Bridge in the background, it feels like a big movie." Stahelski explained that New York offered visual verticality but also areas such as downtown Manhattan, where it could appear almost subterranean, offering the mythological underworld setting they wanted. There were also many restrictions because residents were resistant to film trailers, car chases, and gunfire in their streets. Even on streets closed for filming they had to obey the speed limit, impacting car chase sequences. Stahelski said they could not do everything they wanted as they had to prioritize spending on the location or other departments, and believed New York City was instrumental to conveying the "cool world" of John Wick.

Design
Like Kolstad, Staheliski and Leitch drew on a broad amalgamation of their favorite films and directors for John Wicks visual style. Stahelski described the crime thriller Point Blank (1967) as a significant influence, but they also reviewed the "classic" visual composition of films from the 1960s–1980s, including Le Cercle Rouge (1970), and The Killer (1989), and The Return of the Pink Panther (1975), a comedy in which assassins pursue the central character. They drew on Akira Kurosawa's style of holding on the composition, and John Woo's use of wide shots and multi-opponent combat, as well as Spaghetti Westerns by Sergio Leone. Stahelski said, "look at [Eastwood] in The Good, the Bad and the Ugly—there is so much back-story unsaid there. We just give you some gold coins, and then it's, 'Where do the gold coins come from?' We'll get to that. Have your imagination do some work there." Other influence came from the works of Quentin Tarantino, the films of Lee Marvin and Steve McQueen, graphic novels, and action films, such as Police Story (1985), Armour of God, Lethal Weapon (both 1987), Die Hard, and The Matrix (1999).

Stahelski and Leitch eschewed contemporary action film styles of rapid cuts showing different angles and close up shots that they believed resulted in a "confusing fury of movement." They agreed to perform longer single takes with a wider view of the action, and only cut away to cover up mistakes. This was also a practical decision as there was only budget for a single camera setup and no time for elaborate wire stunts and additional coverage footage that could be used in editing to hide any mistakes. Iwanyk said if they had an extra $5–$10million, they could have afforded a multi-camera setup and second unit filming, but the "economic experience" resulted in a better action film. The directors focused on practical stunts but used computer-generated imagery when necessary to add gun muzzle flashes and complete a stunt of Wick being struck by a car.

The setting combines the familiar, in the private, rural setting of Wick and Helen, which Leitch described as "organic and warm; very cinéma vérité real", and the hyper-real underworld where everything is a "little over the top." Production designer Dan Leigh said "the visual manifestation of [the underworld] is something that transcends reality. The light is a little bit different. There's texture in the air. There are unexpected objects everywhere." Kolstad did not describe the underworld rules or settings in detail which gave the designers lots of leeway. Iwanyk said that the lack of detail prevented them focusing too much on the world building. The directors said the value of the gold coins was unimportant, comparing them to business cards that grant access to underworld services, and that while some aspects of the underworld did not work, the coins informed the audience they were entering a different world. Luca Mosca led costume design, which focused on stylish suits with some functionality over practical combat outfits to provide the underworld "classiness" throughout the film. Mosca used many variant shades of black in the designs, and made them form-fitting, sleek, and "timeless" to fit the immaculate nature of the underworld. Wick's suit was influenced by 1970s style three piece suits worn by film stars such as Steve McQueen and Lee Marvin.

Supervising stunt coordinator J. J. Perry, Stahelski, and 87Eleven associates including John Valera, Jon Eusebio, Danny Hernandez, Guillermo Grispo, Eric Brown, the Machado brothers, Jackson Spidell, and armorer Taran Butler had developed a combat style for a previous film that combined grappling martial arts with gun combat, with a focus on restricting limbs with the left hand and leaving the right hand free for gun action. Combat training took place at 87Eleven's dedicated facility, which included an obstacle course to prepare for the Wick house invasion.

Filming

Principal photography began on October 7, 2013, on a $20–$30million budget, in and around New York City. The shoot was arduous, with stresses over the schedule and budget. There was less daylight for associated scenes, and extensive night-time filming in very cold weather. The first five days of filming began in Mill Neck village with scenes at Wick's house. Iwanyk recalled thinking "oh shit, this movie's not going to work" after watching the crew lighting a stuffed dog stand-in and several scenes of Reeves brooding. He changed his mind after Wick's interaction with the police officer after killing a hitman squad; an "absurd" situation played straight.

Cinematographer Jonathan Sela intended to use anamorphic lenses for Wick's domestic life to create a softer, cleaner image, and spherical lenses for his return to the underworld for a "gritter, darker, and sharper" picture. Once filming began, however, he opted to use the lenses for, respectively, day and night filming, and contrast the use of a static camera position for the early segments and dynamic movements for the remainder of the film. He lit scenes in a "gothic manner" to make the underworld appear a mix of American and European designs, and lit characters to maintain the mystery if they were Wick's friend or foe.

The Red Circle nightclub was filmed at Surrogate's Courthouse (exterior), Edison Theatre (club interior), and the Aire Ancient Baths (below ground spa). The production design added red and blue lighting as well as misted windows to the spa. Sela said they wanted it to look like a part of the underground, but they were constrained by the budget. He thought this sometimes worked in their favor as it forced them to develop creative solutions. Perry was hired to choreograph the nightclub sequence at the last minute because Stahelski was busy filming the final fight between Wick and Viggo. Perry, who portrays four characters killed by Wick in The Red Circle, was only told to begin in the nightclub and move up to the top level. Despite the choregraphy, improvisation often took place based on spontaneous additions during filming. Reeves training allowed him to rapidly adapt to the changes and perform many of his own stunts, so filming often operated at a rapid pace. Iwanyk said they could capture as much footage in an afternoon as others could over three days.

Combat strictly followed the number of bullets in Wick's weapons and included scenes where he could reload. If changes were made, such as adding three enemies to a scene, the number of bullets was changed accordingly and reloading scenes had to be moved. There were some difficulties filming the scene, as the production design had bought incorrect gear, such as the holster, which made it hard for Reeves to draw his gun, and Perry said they used a silencer attachment which would be impractical. There were also minor issues in timing in the spa and the club's upper floor, and not enough filmed footage to cover the inconsistencies resulting in changes to some choreography and scenes to establish the characters' locations. Reeves was also ill, with Iwanyk recalling how he would vomit between scenes then insist on carrying on filming. The insurers refused to let Reeves perform a fall from the club's upper floor; Spidell stood in for falls and other hard impacts.

The fight between Wick and Viggo, filmed at the Brooklyn Navy Yard, was difficult. Filmed over five nights, the temperature was regularly  and the production was prohibited from using artificial rain on one evening because temperatures dropped too low. Reeves also refused to wear a wet suit to help prevent hyperthermia. Iwanyk believed the scene was an ill fitting end the film and would not fare well with audiences because Wick was fighting an older man. The directors had planned for the preceding vehicle sequence to involve several cars but only two turned up. 

The Continental is portrayed by the Beaver Building building (exterior), with interiors portrayed by several buildings throughout Manhattan and Brooklyn, including the Cunard Building, Hotel Wolcott, and a bank vault in the Financial District; marble was glued to its surfaces to make it appear expensive. Viggo's headquarters are the Maritime Exchange Building (exterior facade) and the roof of the ModernHaus SoHo on Grand Street. Filming also took place at Calvary Cemetery, a gas station in Upper Nyack, Republic Airport, Manhattan Bridge, Schaefer Landing, and Bethesda Terrace and Fountain. The church scene was scripted as a bank heist, but scouts struggled to find a suitable location and Stahelski and Leitch believed it was interesting to hide it in a church. The building is portrayed by St. Francis Xavier Church (interior), while the exterior combines the Williamsburgh Savings Bank Building in New York and the Immanuel Presbyterian Church in Los Angeles. 

Filming concluded on December 20, 2013, after nine weeks. The directors described it as a difficult learning experience that included many mistakes and stretched the limits of the budget and schedule, but they achieved their goal. Kolstad lamented the loss of his favorite scene due to scheduling, in which two men at Aurelio's garage see Wick's car being driven in, recognize it, and immediately leave the premises.

Post-production
The film entered post-production on January 10, 2014. Iwanyk described it as a struggle as there was little faith the film would succeed and most of the principle cast and crew moved onto other projects in the interim.

Editor Elísabet Ronaldsdóttir was mainly known for her work on low-budget independent drama films, but her shared dislike for close-up action shots won over the directors. There was no budget for re-shoots and no coverage material so she had to work within the available footage. Iwanyk described a longer version of the film as "painful" because the excessive action made the experience numbing and there were too many establishing shots of people walking or driving. Ronaldsdóttir performed more substantial cuts, bringing John Wick down to 101minutes, which received a more positive response from Iwanyk: "Holy shit! This is good!"

Although Stahelski was unhappy with some of the parts removed, Ronaldsdóttir said they generally removed repetitiveness and shortened action scenes to focus on the overall action aspect and spend less time on Wick's mourning. Wick's fight with Ms. Perkins was edited because they could not show him being as violent with a female character. She did not regret the cuts made, saying, "I like cutting out dialogue. Not because it's not good, it's just because when it's on the page, it's perfect. When you have the actors embody it, you have all the props and sets and the lighting and everything, so a lot of dialogue becomes redundant." The directors found balancing the film's tone with the "over-the-top" action to be the most difficult part of the production. Stahelski wanted the action to be an integral continuation of the story, not just a set-piece. Leitch said, "There's a fine balance, because you’ve seen this kind of movie a thousand times. Too cheesy, too serious, too funny, too goofy, not  enough, too .

The film was shown to a few close associates of Iwanyk, who gave a "lukewarm" response. A public test screening took place in Orange County, California. He said that he knew it was well-received when the audience loudly laughed after the scene in which Aurelio tells Viggo that his son has upset Wick, and Viggo replies, "oh." The response was positive enough that they held no more test screenings. The death of Wick's dog remained a point of contention in post-production from Iwanyk, who believed it would alienate audiences and did not justify the number of deaths in response, but Kolstad and Reeves lobbied to retain it. Reeves told the directors, "You guys wanted to make a hard-core action movie, right? You wanted to do something genre, outside the box, right? So what's wrong?’... So we went back and adjusted our attitude to being unapologetic, and we just went, 'John Wick kills 80 guys because of a puppy. Fuck you, we’re done.'" Test audiences were supportive of Wick avenging his puppy. Despite Stahelski and Leitch's collaboration, the Director's Guild of America refused to co-credit them as director due to internal rules, and Leitch took a producer credit.

Music

Tyler Bates and Joel J. Richard composed the film's score. Stahelski and Leitch requested a "fun, raw, aggressive, unorthodox" score that reflected Wick's connection to his wife and his hitman past. They also wanted a clear difference between the music in each action sequence. Bates and Richard developed a separate tone for the underscore that would allow it to transition into the score's "more rocking aspects." Bates said they tried to understand Wick's thought process and establish the "essence" of his story, and begun writing with the opening scene, which at the time had more immediate transitions between Wick's mourning and the action sequence at the film's denoument. John Wick also features songs including "Killing Strangers" by Marilyn Manson, "The Red Circle" by Le Castle Vania, "Evil Man Blues" by The Candy Shop Boys, "In My Mind" by M86 & Susie Q, and "Who You Talkin' To Man" by Ciscandra Nostalghia. Ronaldsdóttir suggested the use of "Think" by Kaleida.

Release

Distribution and marketing

By August 2014, John Wick had not yet secured a distributor . Industry professionals blamed the low interest on the film's untested directors, Iwanyk's lack of experience in independent film production,and Reeves's declining success at the box office.  His recent films, such as 47 Ronin and Man of Tai Chi (both 2013), had not performed well, even in countries where he was expected to have a strong following, such as China and Japan. This situation coincided with Iwanyk's promotional efforts for John Wick. While the film had secured "strong presales" in some countries, Iwanyk acknowledged that "important territories" were not showing interest in the film.

A screening arranged for studio acquisition executives went poorly, with one viewer walking out shortly after it started. Lionsgate made the only offer, with no upfront payment and a bottom release commitment, which Iwanyk believed meant the film would go straight to home video. However, Lionsgate executives Jason Constantine and Tim Palen championed John Wick, confirming an October release date through its subsidiary Summit Entertainment. The film's title came late in production as Reeves disliked Scorn and regularly referred to it as "John Wick" in interviews. Lionsgate executives equated this to "seven million dollars in free press" and titled it John Wick.

A trailer created by Palen was well-received, as were pre-release screenings at the 2014 Austin Film Festival and Fantastic Fest. Audience demand at Fantastic Fest led to two additional screenings being added. In the week leading up to its release, John Wick was also screened for free in 42 cities across the United States. Box office analyst Scott Mendhelson wrote that Lionsgate's marketing campaign had taken a film with little audience awareness and generated interest by turning a "theoretical B-movie action pick-up into something of an A-level event" and "a coronation for its iconic star [Reeves]." Lionsgate executives suggested that audiences had a favorable opinion of Reeves because of his candid nature in interviews regarding his personal and professional successes and failures. The October announcement that John Wick would play in IMAX theaters, something seen as a "premium" theatrical experience, also further raised its profile.

As a promotional tie-in, the first-person shooter game Payday 2 (2013) added John Wick as a playable character in the week leading up to the film's release. Free copies of the game were also given to people who pre-purchased tickets to the film via Fandango. Variety described it as a "pretty imaginative marketing move", targeting the same male audience as the film without the cost of making a full game based on John Wick.

Context

By the theatrical fall of 2014, the film industry was in decline. The theatrical summer had a total cross of $4.1 billion, a 15% decline from the previous summer and the lowest total since 2006. This was a result of shifting release dates, a lack of anticipated films that were either delayed to 2015 or being distributed via video on demand, and few major projects from top male stars. Even as production costs went down and attendance for female audiences rose, industry analysts blamed the decline on the weaker slate of films released that summer. Studio executives were expecting the late 2014 slate of films to match the previous year’s record performance, with anticipation for Gone Girl, Interstellar, The Hunger Games: Mockingjay – Part 1, and The Hobbit: The Battle of the Five Armies. However, expectations were low for John Wick due to Reeves's recent box office failures and the film's short promotion cycle.

Box office
The premiere of John Wick took place at the Regal Union Square Theater in New York City on October 13, 2014; Reeves was accompanied by Andy the puppy. The event was hosted in partnership with watch company, Carl F. Bucherer, and many of the cast wore the brand's watches for the premiere. 

John Wick was released in the United States and Canada on October 24. During its opening weekend, the film earned $14.4million across 2,589 theaters—a average of $5,568 per theater. This figure made it the number 2 film of the weekend, behind the debut of Ouija ($19.9million) and ahead of Fury ($13.3million), which was in its second weekend. The performance of John Wick was a surprise success, nearly doubling analysts' low expectations and pre-release estimates of $7–$10million, and over-performing across 347 IMAX theaters with $2.5million, accounting for 18% of its total box office. The film attracted a mostly male audience, with about 77% being over 25 years of age. John Wick fell to number 6 in its second weekend with a gross of $8million, and number 8 in its third with $4.1million. It left the top ten-highest-grossing films by its fourth weekend with a gross of $2.2million. John Wick left theaters by January 22, 2015, with a total box office of $43million, making it the number 79 highest-grossing film of the year.

Outside of the U.S. and Canada, John Wick is estimated to have earned a further $43million, performing well in Germany ($3.7million), France ($3.2million), Australia ($2.8million), Taiwan ($2.6million), Russia ($2.59million), the United Kingdom ($2.4million), and Japan ($2.3million), among others. This made it the number 114 highest-grossing film outside of the U.S. and Canada. Cumulatively, John Wick earned an estimated worldwide gross of $86million, making it number 89 highest-grossing film of 2014.

Reception

Critical response
John Wick received generally positive reviews. The consensus reads; "Stylish, thrilling, and giddily kinetic, John Wick serves as a satisfying return to action for Keanu Reeves – and what looks like it could be the first of a franchise." The film has a score of 68 out of 100 on Metacritic based on 40 critics, indicating "generally favorable reviews." Audiences polled by CinemaScore gave the film an average grade of "B" on an A+-to-F scale.

Critics were near unanimous in their praise for Reeves's performance, describing it as a return to form for the actor. Richard Corliss, among others, believed it was a fitting role for the actor, benefitting from his stoic and taciturn demeanor for a character who conveys intent through actions. Bilge Ebiri said John Wick would have been a typical revenge story with any other actor, but the "ethereal and ageless" Reeves made it "mythic." The Atlantic and The New York Times praised Reeves for being able to suggest depths to his character and portray a physical charisma while maintaining a relatively blank expression. Others praised his believable physicality and athleticism that enhanced the many combat sequences and long single takes. However, Peter Bradshaw wrote that Reeves's deadpan style could only work when contrasted with humorous dialogue, and considered John Wick to be "pretty humorless." Praise was also given to the main supporting cast, particularly McShane and Nyqvist, though there was  criticism that the actors were underutilized. 

The decades of experience in stunt work shared by the directors was seen as a major benefit to the film's action sequences, with Stephanie Zacharek describing them as among the "most beautifully choreographed" set-pieces in an American action film for a long time. Reviews characterized the action scenes by their "fluidity" and "grace" that relied on both the proficiency of their performers and innovative choreography that eschewed slow-motion focus for a blunt, direct manner that provided more shock value and were impressive in their competency, and their brutal, efficient nature, reflecting of the film's main character. Some publications highlighted the film's deliberate avoidance of shaky camera movements and quick editing in favor of longer takes that helped immerse the audience in the "sleek" choreography, which made John Wick stand out from its peers. Variety said that the high number of equally impressive action sequences made up for the weak script.

While critics generally described the narrative as a self-serious, cliche-filled and predictable action script with a stylistic approach, they believed it offered a novel setting, creating intrigue related to Wick's past and the mythology developed around the criminal underworld. The mythology in John Wick is identified as a key aspect that sets it apart from other action movies, particularly the codes and rules that govern the criminals and the Continental hotel, which enforces a neutral ground and provides a contrast to the otherwise non-stop violence in the rest of the film. Entertainment Weekly described the world-building as "rich" and "stylish," with Hoffman hoping for future films to explore this setting, even without the John Wick characters.

Accolades
At the 2014 Golden Schmoes Awards John Wick was named the Biggest Surprise of the Year, and was nominated for Most Underrated Movie and Coolest Character (Wick). Reeves received a nomination for the Razzie Redeemer Award at the 35th Golden Raspberry Awards. At the 2015 Taurus World Stunt Awards, John Wick won the award for Best Fight for the scene of Wick defending his home against Viggo's hitmen. The award was presented to Reeves's stunt double, Jackson Spidell, stunt coorindators Darrin Prescott and Jonathan Eusebio, fight coordinator Jon Valera, and stunt performers Carlos Lopez, Daniel Hernandez, Dean Neistat, Justin Yu, Akos Schenek, and Luis Moco. Prescott was also nominated for Best Stunt Coordinator and/or 2nd Unit Direction. At the Golden Trailer Awards, recognizing marketing campaigns, the film's poster was named Best Thriller Poster. It was also nominated for Best Action Trailer and Best Action Poster. Dafoe received the Body of Work award at the San Diego Film Critics Society Awards 2014.

Post-release

Home media
John Wick was released as a digital download in January 2015. This was followed by a DVD and Blu-ray release in February. The physical release included a commentary track by Stahelski and Leitch, as well as six brief featurettes about the training and design of the stunt work ("Don't F*#% with John Wick"), the making of the film ("Calling in the Cavalry"), Stahelski's and Leitch's history as stunt coordinators ("Destiny of a Collective"), the different aspects of the film's criminal underworld ("The Assassin's Code"), the nightclub action sequence ("The Red Circle"), and the influence of New York City on John Wick ("N.Y.C. Noir"). The release was a success, being the second best selling home release of February, behind Dracula Untold (2014), and the number 1 rental during its release week. About 50% of its sales were on the Blu-ray format. A 4K Ultra HD Blu-ray version was released in 2017, containing all previously released features. The digital release had earned about $20million by May 2015, and the physical release about $44million by 2022. 

The John Wick soundtrack was released by Varese Sarabande Records in October 2014.

Other media

John Wick Chronicles (2017) is a first-person shooter virtual reality game based on the film for HTC Vive and Steam VR allowing users to play as Wick while assassinating powerful targets. John Wick Hex (2019) is a tactical third person game serving as a prequel to the events of the film, involving Wick rescuing Winston (voiced by McShane) and Charon (Reddick). The video game Fortnite also added a John Wick character skin in 2019.

A five-issue comic book series was released between September 2017 and January 2018. Written by Greg Pak, the series is a prequel to John Wick, depicting Wick's integration into the assassin underworld.

Thematic analysis
Professor Ann C. Hall wrote that Wick is a postmodern epic hero in a contemporary epic universe. She believed the John Wick franchise satisfies all but one of the six requirements to be classified as an epic: the imposing hero is of national or international importance and legendary significance; the setting is vast; the hero conducts great deeds of valor or superhuman courage; the tale involves powerful forces; and characters speak in stylized ways. However, it fails the requirement of objectivity as Wick is the protagonist and generally presented positively. In this way, Hall links the film's narrative to elements of Samurai lore, Russian folktales, and historical epics from Christianity, ancient Greece, Rome, and the Mediterranean. Doctor Wayne Wong wrote that Stahelski and Reeves have collaborated throughout their careers with choreographers familiar with action in Kung fu films, such as Yuen Woo-ping and Tiger Chen, and John Wick can be seen as a synthesis of Eastern and Western action styles.

Professor Scott T. Alison and doctor George R. Goethal argue that while Wick has faults and is a ruthless killer, he does not have to objectively good and his heroism comes in retaining his integrity against the criminal underworld which is unjust and violent. Wick's puppy serves as a connection to his wife and demonstrates his softer side, and Iosef killing it unites the audience against him and anyone in Wick's quest for revenge. Professor Owen R. Horton described Wick as "one of the deadliest and most brutal heroes in modern action cinema," yet unlike other contemporary action heroes, Wick regularly retreats to his softer side that is defined by his love for his wife. This, Horton suggests represents the conflicting multiplicities of manhood. Critic Emmanuel Levy wrote that the central question of John Wick is if Wick is a bad person who became good, or a good person who has done bad things, and if he can truly change or be redeemed. Kolstad said that even though Wick had left his former life behind, he remained in the outskirts of the city, seeing a reminder of it every time he stepped outside his home and not truly escaping its shadow.

Hall also analysed Wick from the perspective of Reeves's personal life. She believed that the character and hero share many characteristics and that Reeves, in the vein of epic heroes, faced obstacles in his career but persisted with acting despite criticism, and he faced personal trials of both courage and loss that inspire his character and make audiences sympathetic to him. Professor Lisa Coulthard and author Lindsay Steenberg agreed that Reeves's and Wick's personalities are almost interchangeable, sharing a similar mixed-race background, personal tragedies, professionalism, and an inherent likeability, all of which adds authenticity to the character and film.

Legacy

Lasting reception
John Wick is regarded as one of the best action films ever made. Several publications have named it one of the best action films of the 21st century, and among the best films in Reeves's filmography. Analysts considered John Wicks success to be an example of a cult sleeper hit driven by strong word-of-mouth and a positive critical reception from critics and audiences. Its audience grew following its release on home video and streaming, growing support for a sequel, which became a financially and critically successful film series, and gave Reeves his most mainstream success since The Matrix films. Reeves said, "We certainly didn't know when we started on John Wick that it would become like this... We're only getting to tell these stories because of the audience. So thank you."

Cultural influence
Commentary by Rolling Stone and Collider said that before John Wick the action genre had been in decline with popular film series such as Die Hard and Rambo generally replaced with "forgettable" fare that relied heavily on CGI, shaky camera movements, and rapid edits or the greater focus on superhuman bouts in superhero films. In contrast, publications described John Wick as a groundbreaking entry in the action genre, in part because of its extensively choreographed sequences and practical effects filmed in longer takes. Author Ray Morton said the film revitalized the action genre by combining choreography, stylish video-game style visuals, and explicit gore and violence.

John Wicks success launched one of the most successful action franchises ever. Rolling Stone named it "The Last Great American Action-Movie Franchise", transforming what would normally be a B-movie into an "action-cinema connoisseur's dream come true." The mythology involved in the film's criminal underworld, such as unique currency and a strict code of rules, is also seen as contributing to the success of John Wick. Iwanyk said they had no idea during the production how "evocative" the underworld would be with audiences.

As John Wick was influenced by the history of action cinema, it is seen as an influence on many action films that followed, such as Atomic Blonde (2017), Guns Akimbo (2019), Extraction (2020),  Gunpowder Milkshake, Jolt, The Protégé, and Nobody (all 2021), which was also written by Kolstad.

Far Out described Wick as a groundbreaking role for Reeves, whose pragmatic attitude, "slick" appearance, and relatable revenge story, serving to revive the actor's career. MovieWeb wrote that Wick being a legendary character before the film begins was a "genius" decision, adding depth to the character and the film's universe, while keeping him sympathetic through the loss of his wife and puppy. The publication suggested that Reeves's iconic status contributed to the character's popularity, and that his dedication to performing many of his own stunts and learning combat techniques led to similar approaches from other actors, such as Charlize Theron in Atomic Blonde and Bob Odenkirk in Nobody. John Wicks success made Stahelski and Leitch in-demand action directors, with Stahelski directing the film's sequels, while Leitch moved outside the series to direct films such as Atomic Blonde, Deadpool 2 (2018), and Bullet Train (2022).

Sequels and spin-offs

John Wick was not intended to have a sequel, but its success, particularly in markets outside the U.S., led to immediate development on a follow-up. John Wick: Chapter 2 (2017) doubled the box office of John Wick and received a similarly positive critical and audience response. It was followed by John Wick: Chapter 3 – Parabellum (2019), which nearly quadrupled the box office of John Wick and became one of the highest-grossing films of 2019. A fourth film, John Wick: Chapter 4, is scheduled for release in March 2023.

The John Wick franchise has spawned several spin-offs: The Continental is an upcoming miniseries focusing on the Continental hotel and its clientele. Ballerina is an upcoming film starring Ana de Armas as Rooney, an assassin on her own quest for revenge.

Notes and references

Notes

References

Works cited

External links
 
 
 
 

2014 films
Gun fu films
American films about revenge
Films about dogs
Films about pets
Films about animal cruelty
2014 action thriller films
American action thriller films
American neo-noir films
Films about the Russian Mafia
Films directed by Chad Stahelski
Films scored by Tyler Bates
Films set in New Jersey
Films set in New York City
Films shot in New York City
Films shot in New York (state)
IMAX films
Summit Entertainment films
1
Films with screenplays by Derek Kolstad
2014 directorial debut films
Films produced by Basil Iwanyk
Thunder Road Films films
2010s English-language films
2010s American films